The 2012 Tour of Flanders was the 96th edition of the Tour of Flanders single-day "Monument" cycling race. It was held on 1 April 2012 over a distance of  – between Bruges and Oudenaarde – and was the eighth race of the 2012 UCI World Tour season.

In a three-man sprint finish, the race was won by  Belgian Tom Boonen, who in the process, became the fifth different rider to win the race three times, and took the lead of the overall World Tour standings.

Course change

The course of the classic was changed drastically. The finish was changed from Meerbeke to Oudenaarde due to the result of a changed parcours to the race. Famous hills like the Muur van Geraardsbergen and the Bosberg were the final two hills in almost every edition from 1975 but were removed from the course. The new final featured the Oude Kwaremont and Paterberg, both were climbed three times. Also included in the final were the infamous Koppenberg – climbed after the first passage of the Oude Kwaremont and Paterberg – as well as the Steenbeekdries and the Kluisberg.

2010 winner Fabian Cancellara stated in the Belgium TV show De Laatste Show that he liked the new route of the race. He said that he disliked the dead moment from Tenbosse until the Muur in the old route and also the flat kilometres after the Bosberg until the finish. While Cancellara liked the new route, some riders expressed negative feelings about the new route. Two-time winner Stijn Devolder stated that: "This is no longer the Ronde van Vlaanderen". Former Belgian cyclist and three-time winner Johan Museeuw stated that the course was potentially made too hard: "Three times up the Oude Kwaremont and Paterberg can blow you away. The course didn't really need to be made harder, I think."

Many cycling fans, especially those in Belgium, also expressed against the changes in the route and thinking that the changes were made for commercial reasons. The omission of the Muur was not received well by the fans and was like "removing the Poggio from Milan–San Remo. The "Muur" was included in the first World Tour E3 Harelbeke in 2012.

Hills in the 2012 edition

Participating teams
As the Tour of Flanders was a UCI World Tour event, all 18 UCI ProTeams were invited automatically and obligated to send a squad. Seven other squads were given wildcard places into the race, and as such, formed the event's 25-team peloton.

The 25 teams that competed in the race were:

Race summary
Two main favourites were named before the race, 2005 and 2006 winner Tom Boonen and 2010 winner Fabian Cancellara, with outsiders including Matti Breschel, Sylvain Chavanel, Peter Sagan, Filippo Pozzato and Sep Vanmarcke.

A group of 15 riders, including amongst others Tyler Farrar, Pablo Lastras and Maarten Tjallingii, formed the early breakaway, but due to the size of the group there were not allowed to gain more than five minutes over the peloton.

But the first major event happened some  later, as Cancellara crashed out of the race, fracturing his collar bone in four places.

At the start of the second ascent of the Paterberg, several riders crashed in the first part of the peloton, allowing a very select group of riders to take some advantage over the rest of the peloton. This elite group, which amongst others contained Boonen, Niki Terpstra, Chavanel, Sagan, Vanmarcke, Pozzato, Alessandro Ballan, Luca Paolini and Vincent Jérôme, raced past the remainder of the breakaway group and at that point seemed to be battling it out for the win. However, the riders stopped cooperating and in the peloton  chased hard in an attempt to bring Edvald Boasson Hagen back to the lead group, succeeding just before the third ascent of the Oude Kwaremont. During this ascent, Ballan raced away from the pack, only to be caught a few minutes later by Pozzato and Boonen.

Ballan, Boonen and Pozzato climbed the final ascent of the Paterberg together and despite numerous attempts by Ballan to get away from the other two, the three riders contested the sprint for the victory. In Oudenaarde, Boonen outsprinted Pozzato by one bike-length at the line, with Ballan taking third place. In a group of 43 riders finishing within one minute of the three leaders, Greg Van Avermaet finished in fourth place, edging out Sagan in fifth.  were represented three times within the top ten; along with Boonen's win, Terpstra and Chavanel also placed highly.

General standings

References

External links
Race website

2012 in Belgian sport
Tour of Flanders
2012